The International Society Daughters of Utah Pioneers (ISDUP, DUP) is a women's organization dedicated to preserving the history of the original settlers of the geographic area covered by the State of Deseret and Utah Territory, including Mormon pioneers. The organization is open to any woman who is: (1) A direct-line descendant or legally adopted direct-line descendant with a pioneer ancestor; (2) the pioneer ancestor is a person who traveled to or through the geographic area covered by the State of Deseret/Utah Territory between July 1847 and 10 May 1869 (completion of the railroad, May 10, 1869); (3) over the age of eighteen, and of good character. Travel through the geographic area covered by the State of Deseret/Utah Territory can be either east to west, west to east, north to south, or south to north.

History
The Daughters of Utah Pioneers was organized 11 April 1901 in Salt Lake City. Annie Taylor Hyde, a daughter of John Taylor, president of the Church of Jesus Christ of Latter-day Saints, invited a group of fifty-four women to her home seeking to perpetuate the names and achievements of the men, women and children who were the pioneers in founding this commonwealth. The DUP (ISDUP) followed the lead of other national lineage societies, such as the Daughters of the American Revolution, in acting as a nonpolitical and nonsectarian organization.  In 1925, the now International Society Daughters of Utah Pioneers (ISDUP) and its local units were legally incorporated.

Kate B. Carter was President of Daughters of Utah Pioneers from April 1941 until her death in September 1976, serving the longest of any of its presidents. She served as President of the Days of '47 Parade from its start in 1947 until her death.

Achievements
In later decades, the ISDUP (DUP) has worked to conserve historical sites and landmarks, to collect artifacts, relics, manuscripts, photographs, and to educate its members and the general public. The society maintains satellite museums in the intermountain west, eighty-six of them in Utah, and manages an extensive collection in its Salt Lake City museum (Pioneer Memorial Museum). Numerous books have been published by the society, including community and family histories, cookbooks, history texts, children's stories, and a four-volume collection of biographical sketches "Pioneer Women of Faith and Fortitude" (1998).

Organizational structure
ISDUP headquarters are located in the Pioneer Memorial Museum in Salt Lake City, Utah. The international organization is administered by a board. Membership is organized into "companies," whose presiding officers oversee the activities of "camps" of ten or more members in a geographic area. In 2006, the ISDUP consisted of 185 companies overseeing 1,050 camps in the United States and Canada with a total living membership of 21,451.

See also
 List of Mormon family organizations
 Mormon pioneers
 Sons of Utah Pioneers

References

 Carter, Kate B., editor. "The Daughters of Utah Pioneers", article within the 12 volume series, "Heart Throbs of the West." Daughters of the Utah Pioneers, Salt Lake City, 1939-51.

External links

 Official site
 Daughters of the Utah Pioneers biographies, MSS 5888 at L. Tom Perry Special Collections, Brigham Young University
 Daughters of Utah Pioneers, Phillips Camp Biographies at University of Utah Digital Library, Marriott Library Special Collections

1901 establishments in Utah
Historical societies in Utah
History of Utah
Lineage societies
Daughters of Utah Pioneers
Presidents of Daughters of Utah Pioneers
State based fraternal and lineage societies
Utah Territory
Women in Utah